In mathematics, a standard Borel space is the Borel space associated to a Polish space.  Discounting Borel spaces of discrete Polish spaces, there is, up to isomorphism of measurable spaces, only one standard Borel space.

Formal definition

A measurable space  is said to be "standard Borel" if there exists a metric on  that makes it a complete separable metric space in such a way that  is then the Borel σ-algebra.
Standard Borel spaces have several useful properties that do not hold for general measurable spaces.

Properties

This follows from Souslin's theorem, as a set that is both analytic and coanalytic is necessarily Borel.
 The product and direct union of a countable family of standard Borel spaces are standard.
 Every complete probability measure on a standard Borel space turns it into a standard probability space.

Kuratowski's theorem

Theorem. Then  as a Borel space is Borel isomorphic to one of
(1)  (2)  or (3) a finite discrete space. (This result is reminiscent of Maharam's theorem.)

It follows that a standard Borel space is characterized up to isomorphism by its cardinality, and that any uncountable standard Borel space has the cardinality of the continuum.

Borel isomorphisms on standard Borel spaces are analogous to homeomorphisms on topological spaces: both are bijective and closed under composition, and a homeomorphism and its inverse are both continuous, instead of both being only Borel measurable.

See also

References

Descriptive set theory
General topology
Measure theory
Space (mathematics)